Ani-Jam was an annual two-day anime convention held during August at the Fresno Convention Center in Fresno, California.

Programming
The convention offered anime screenings, a cosplay masquerade, live music, table top games, vendors, video game tournaments, and workshops.

History
The first event in 2003 was produced by Japanese entertainment website, Neo-Tokyo 2099 and cosplay website, Cosplay Underground as a mini con/test event held on March 28, 2003 at the Ramada Inn in Fresno, California to find out if an anime convention was plausible in Central Valley of California.  

The mini convention lasted for six hours and what was estimated to bring in 150-250 attendees, the event attracted over 500 attendees. 

The event would then return as a multi-day convention in 2006 under new ownership and was held at the Fresno Fairgrounds, followed by the Radisson Hotel in 2007 and the convention would later relocate to the Fresno Convention Center in 2012.

Ani-Jam celebrated its 10th anniversary in 2013. The convention held a day zero (Friday) event before the start of the 2014 convention where pre-registered attendees could attend a formal ball.

Event history

Ani-Vent
Ani-Vent was a one-day convention held in 2010 with the goal of expanding into different events.

Event history

References

Other Related News Articles
Anime convention in Downtown Fresno abc30, Retrieved 2013-09-03
Anime Festival Draws Large Crowds In Fresno KMPH, Retrieved 2013-09-03
Ani-Jam KSEE, Retrieved 2013-09-03
Fresno Convention Center To Hold Ani-Jam 2013 KMPH, Retrieved 2013-09-03

External links
Ani-Jam official website

Defunct anime conventions
Annual events in California
Conventions in California
Culture of Fresno, California
Tourist attractions in Fresno, California
Recurring events established in 2003
2003 establishments in California